The molecular formula  (molar mass: 346.50 g/mol, exact mass: 346.2508 u) may refer to:

 Androstanolone propionate
 

Molecular formulas